Clarence George Issenmann (May 30, 1907 – July 27, 1982) was an American prelate of the Roman Catholic Church. He served as an auxiliary bishop of the Archdiocese of Cincinnati in Ohio from 1954 to 1957 as bishop of the Diocese of Columbus in Ohio from 1957 to 1964, and as bishop of the Diocese of Cleveland in Ohio from 1966 to 1974.

Biography

Early life 
Clarence Issenmann was born on May 30, 1907, in Hamilton, Ohio, the only child of Innocent J. Issenmann (a grocer) and Amelia L. (née Stricker) Issenmann. Clarence Issenmann worked as delivery boy and meat cutter for his father as young man.  He attended St. Ann's School and then Hamilton Catholic High School, both in Hamilton.

After graduating from high school, Issenmann entered St. Joseph's College in Rensselaer, Indiana.  He then returned to Cincinnati to study at St. Gregory's and Mount St. Mary of the West seminaries.

Priesthood 
Issenmann was ordained to the priesthood for the Archdiocese of Cincinnati by Archbishop John McNicholas on June 29, 1932.  After his ordination, Issenmann continued his studies at the University of Fribourg in Fribourg, Switzerland, obtaining his Licentiate of Philosophy.  He then entered the Pontifical University of St. Thomas Aquinas in Rome, Receiving a Doctor of Theology degree. After returning to the United States, Issenmann entered Regis University in Denver, Colorado, where he received a Doctor of Journalism degree.  While in Denver, Issenmann also worked on the staff of the Denver Register. 

In 1938, Issenmann was appointed editor of the archdiocesan newspaper of Cincinnati, the Catholic Telegraph Register. He was named as a professor of theology in 1942 at Mt. St. Mary Seminary.  Issenmann was raised to the rank of monsignor in 1943 and became chancellor and vicar general in 1945.

Auxiliary Bishop of Cincinnati 
On March 24, 1954, Issenmann was appointed auxiliary bishop of the Archdiocese of Cincinnati and titular bishop of Phytea by Pope Pius XII. He received his episcopal consecration on May 25, 1954, from Archbishop Karl Alter, with Archbishop Urban Vehr and Bishop George Rehring serving as co-consecrators.

Bishop of Columbus 
Pope Pius XII appointed Issenmann as the sixth bishop of the Diocese of Columbus on December 5, 1957.

During his tenure in Columbus, Issenmann established the Diocesan Development Fund so as to supply for the expansion of the diocese, which added eight parishes and six high schools under Issenmann. He also found a new building to house diocesan offices, and offered a televised Mass every week. Attending the Second Vatican Council in Rome from 1962 to 1965, he also served as the assistant episcopal chair of lay organizations for the National Catholic Welfare Conference.

Coadjutor Bishop and Bishop of Cleveland 
Pope Paul VI appointed Issenmann as coadjutor bishop of the Diocese of Cleveland and titular bishop of Filaca on October 7, 1964. He was installed on February 2, 1965 at St. John's Cathedral in Cleveland. Issenmann automatically succeeded Bishop Edward Hoban as the seventh bishop of Cleveland on September 22, 1966. As bishop, he constructed the following schools in the diocese:

 Villa Angela Academy in Cleveland, 
 Lake Catholic High School in Mentor 
 Lorain Catholic High School in Lorain 
 St. Vincent-St. Mary High School in Akron

In November 1968, Issenmann asked all adults attending mass in the diocese to sign petitions of support for Humanae vitae, Pope Paul VI's 1969 encyclical against artificial birth control.  Issenmann was the only bishop in the country to make that request of parishioners.

Retirement and legacy 
After suffering several strokes, Issenmann requested early retirement from the pope.  His resignation as bishop of the Diocese of Cleveland was accepted by Pope Paul VI on June 5, 1974.  After his retirement, Issenmann continued to live in Cleveland. Clarence Issenmann died in Cleveland on July 27, 1982, at age 75.  He was interred in the Resurrection Chapel in St. John's Cathedral.

References

External links
Catholic-Hierarchy
Diocese of Columbus

1907 births
1982 deaths
Saint Joseph's College (Indiana) alumni
Pontifical University of Saint Thomas Aquinas alumni
Regis University alumni
Roman Catholic Archdiocese of Cincinnati
Roman Catholic bishops of Columbus
Roman Catholic bishops of Cleveland
20th-century Roman Catholic bishops in the United States
Participants in the Second Vatican Council
People from Hamilton, Ohio
Burials in Ohio